Wivelrod Manor is a country manor situated in the hamlet of Wivelrod in the parish of Bentworth, Hampshire. The manor neighbours the nearby Alton Abbey.

In the 18th century Wivelrod Manor was part of the Bentworth Hall estate until 1832 when the estate was bought by Roger Staples Fisher.

References

Country houses in Hampshire
East Hampshire District
Manor houses in England